The Patent Act of 1836 established a number of important changes in the United States patent system.  These include:

The examination of patent applications prior to issuing a patent.  This was the second time this was done anywhere in the world. The only other time an examination period existed prior to this act was in the United States from 1790 to 1793 under the Patent Act of 1790. Prior to this, patents were issued on all applications, even if they were direct copies of earlier patents. It was left to the courts to decide validity in the event of a lawsuit.
The option of extending an existing patent's term for an additional seven years, making the maximum term of patent 21 years. (This was abolished in 1861 and replaced with a single 17-year term.)
The hiring of professional patent examiners.  Initially only one examiner was hired, but soon a second one was hired to handle the increased workload.
The establishment of a library of prior art to assist in examinations.

See also 
 United States patent law
 1836 U.S. Patent Office fire
 Patent Office 1877 fire

References

1836 in American law
United States federal patent legislation
History of patent law